A biomarker, or biological marker, is defined as a "cellular, biochemical or molecular alteration in cells, tissues or fluids that can be measured and evaluated to indicate normal biological processes, pathogenic processes, or pharmacological responses to a therapeutic intervention." Biomarkers characterize disease progression starting from the earliest natural history of the disease.  Biomarkers assess disease susceptibility and severity, which allows one to predict outcomes, determine interventions and evaluate therapeutic responses. From a forensics and epidemiologic perspective, biomarkers offer unique insight about the relationships between environmental risk factors.

Identification 

Biomarker testing involves looking for genes, proteins, biomarkers, or even tumor markers for cancer. Biomarker testing can either be somatic or germline. It is a laboratory test to find blood, tissue, and other body fluids biomarkers. A biomarker test may be called a companion diagnostic test if paired with a specific treatment. Biomarker testing differs from genetic testing, which determines if someone has inherited mutations that make them more likely to get cancer.

Classes 
Three broad classes of biomarkers are prognostic biomarkers, predictive biomarkers and pharmacodynamic biomarkers.

Prognostic 
Prognostic biomarkers give intervention-independent information on disease status through screening, diagnosis and disease monitoring.  Prognostic biomarkers can signify individuals in the latent period of a disease's natural history, allowing optimal therapy and prevention until the disease's termination. Prognostic biomarkers give information on disease status by measuring the internal precursors that increase or decrease the likelihood of attaining a disease.  For example, blood pressure and cholesterol are biomarkers for CVD. Prognostic biomarkers can be direct or indirect to the causal pathway of a disease.  If a prognostic biomarker is a direct step in the causal pathway, it is one of the factors or products of the disease.  A prognostic biomarker could be indirectly associated with a disease if it is related to a change caused by the exposure, or related to an unknown factor connected with the exposure or disease.

Predictive 
Predictive biomarkers measure the effect of a drug and tell if the drug is having its expected activity, but do not offer any direct information on the disease.  Predictive biomarkers are highly sensitive and specific; therefore they increase diagnostic validity of a drug or toxin's site-specific effect by eliminating recall bias and subjectivity from those exposed. For example, when an individual is exposed to a drug or toxin, the concentration of that drug or toxin within the body, or the biological effective dose, provides a more accurate prediction for the effect of the drug or toxin compared to an estimation or measurement of the toxin from the origin or external environment.

Pharmacodynamic 
Pharmacodynamic (PD) biomarkers can measure the direct interaction between a drug and its receptor.  Pharmacodynamic biomarkers reveal drug mechanisms, if the drug has its intended effect on the biology of the disease, ideal biological dosing concentrations, and physiologic response/resistance mechanisms. Pharmacodynamic biomarkers are particularly relevant in drug mechanisms of tumor cells, where pharmacodynamic endpoints for drug interventions can be assessed directly on tumor tissues.  For example, protein phosphorylation biomarkers indicate alterations in target protein kinases and activation of downstream signaling molecules.

Monitoring 

These biomarkers are used to assess presence, status or extent of a disease or medical condition. They even evaluate the response to the intervention.

Susceptibility/risk  
These are biomarkers that are used to measure the risk of an individual to develop a disease or medical condition in patients who aren't infected by a disease or a medical condition.

Safety  

Safety biomarkers predict toxic adverse events induced by drug, medical intervention or even environmental agent exposure

Clinical applications 
Biomarkers can be classified on their clinical applications as molecular biomarkers, cellular biomarkers or imaging biomarkers.

Molecular 
Four of the main types of molecular biomarkers are genomic biomarkers, transcriptomic biomarkers, proteomic biomarkers and metabolic biomarkers.

Genomic 
Genomic biomarkers analyze DNA by identifying irregular sequences in the genome, typically a single nucleotide polymorphism.  Genetic biomarkers are particularly significant in cancer because most cancer cell lines carry somatic mutations.  Somatic mutations are distinguishable from hereditary mutations because the mutation is not in every cell; just the tumor cells, making them easy targets.

Transcriptomic 

Transcriptomic biomarkers analyze all RNA molecules, not solely the exome.  Transcriptomic biomarkers reveal the molecular identity and concentration of RNA in a specific cell or population. Pattern-based RNA expression analysis provides increased diagnostic and prognostic capability in predicting therapeutic responses for individuals. For example, distinct RNA subtypes in breast cancer patients have different survival rates.

Proteomic 
Proteomics permits the quantitative analysis and detection of changes to proteins or protein biomarkers.  Protein biomarkers detect a variety of biological changes, such as protein-protein interactions, post-translational modifications and immunological responses.

Cellular 
Cellular biomarkers allow cells to be isolated, sorted, quantified and characterized by their morphology and physiology. Cellular biomarkers are used in both clinical and laboratory settings, and can discriminate between a large sample of cells based on their antigens. An example of a cellular biomarker sorting technique is Fluorescent-activated cell sorting.

Imaging 
Imaging biomarkers allow earlier detection of disease compared to molecular biomarkers, and streamline translational research in the drug discovery marketplace. For example, one could determine the percent of receptors a drug targets, shortening the time and money of research during the new drug development stage.  Imaging biomarkers also are non-invasive, which is a clinical advantage over molecular biomarkers. Some of the image-based biomarkers are X-Ray, Computed Tomography (CT), Positron Emission Tomography (PET), Single Photo Emission Computed Tomography (SPECT) and Magnetic Resonance Imaging (MRI).

Examples 
 Embryonic: Embryonic biomarkers are very important to fetuses, as each cell's role is decided through the use of biomarkers. Research has been conducted concerning the use of embryonic stem cells (ESCs) in regenerative medicine. This is because certain biomarkers within a cell could be altered (most likely in the tertiary stage of their formation) to change the future role of the cell, thereby creating new ones. One example of an embryonic biomarker is the protein Oct-4.
Autism: ASDs are complex; autism is a medical condition with several etiologies caused due to the interactions between environmental conditions and genetic vulnerability. The challenge in finding out the biomarkers related to ASDs is that they may reflect genetic or neurobiological changes that may be active only to a certain point. ASDs show heterogeneous clinical symptoms and genetic architecture, which have hindered the identification of common genetic susceptibility factors. Still, many researches are being done to find out the main reason behind the genetic incomparability.

Cancer: Biomarkers have an extremely high upside for therapeutic interventions in cancer patients.  Most cancer biomarkers consist of proteins or altered segments of DNA, and are expressed in all cells, just at higher rates in cancer cells.  There has not yet been one, universal tumor biomarker, but there is a biomarker for every type of cancer.  These tumor biomarkers are used to track the health of tumors, but cannot serve as the sole diagnostic for specific cancers. Examples of tumoral markers used to follow up cancer treatment are the Carcinoembryonic Antigen (CEA) for colorectal cancer and the Prostate Specific Antigen (PSA) for prostate cancer.  In 2014, Cancer research identified Circulating Tumor Cells (CTCs) and Circulating Tumor DNA (ctDNA) as metastasizing tumor biomarkers with special cellular differentiation and prognostic skills. Innovative technology needs to be harnessed to determine the full capabilities of CTCs and ctDNA, but insight into their roles has potential for new understanding of cancer evolution, invasion and metastasis.

References 

Cell biology